Gillón is one of 54 parish councils in Cangas del Narcea, a municipality within the province and autonomous community of Asturias, in northern Spain. 

The population is 78 (2007).

References

Parishes in Cangas del Narcea